Kangiqsualujjuaq (Georges River) Airport  is located  northwest of Kangiqsualujjuaq, Quebec, Canada.

Airlines and destinations

References

External links

Certified airports in Nord-du-Québec